Whitley City is a census-designated place (CDP) in McCreary County, Kentucky, United States. The population was 1,170 at the 2010 census. Despite its name, it is not an incorporated city; however, it is the county seat of McCreary County. Whitley City is one of two non-city county seats in Kentucky (the other being Burlington in Boone County). This is due to McCreary County not having any cities. With a 2013-2017 Annual Median Household income of $9,234, Whitley City is the poorest place in the United States (excluding Puerto Rico) with a population greater than 1,000.

Geography
Whitley City is located at  (36.724389, -84.470342).

Yahoo Falls on the course of Yahoo Creek is located here.

Demographics

As of the census of 2000, there were 1,111 people, 458 households, and 296 families residing in the CDP. The racial makeup of the CDP was 98.92% White, 0.72% Native American, 0.09% from other races, and 0.27% from two or more races. Hispanic or Latino of any race were 0.54% of the population.

There were 458 households, out of which 32.3% had children under the age of 18 living with them, 38.6% were married couples living together, 20.7% had a female householder with no husband present, and 35.2% were non-families. 31.9% of all households were made up of individuals, and 12.2% had someone living alone who was 65 years of age or older. The average household size was 2.31 and the average family size was 2.89.

In the CDP, the population was spread out, with 25.6% under the age of 18, 10.6% from 18 to 24, 28.1% from 25 to 44, 23.0% from 45 to 64, and 12.7% who were 65 years of age or older. The median age was 35 years. For every 100 females, there were 88.3 males. For every 100 females age 18 and over, there were 88.8 males.

The median income for a household in the CDP was $18,654, and the median income for a family was $18,702. Males had a median income of $29,306 versus $22,500 for females. The per capita income for the CDP was $11,659. About 28.9% of families and 38.8% of the population were below the poverty line, including 58.8% of those under age 18 and 12.4% of those age 65 or over.

Education
Whitley City has a lending library, the McCreary County Public Library.

Notable people
Allie Leggett – former Miss Kentucky USA

Media
 WHAY Radio 98.3FM
 McCreary County Record
 The McCreary County Voice

References

Census-designated places in McCreary County, Kentucky
Census-designated places in Kentucky
County seats in Kentucky